Engineering Holding (now doing business as S7 Technics) is a Russian company specializing in aircraft maintenance, repair, and overhaul. The company's full name was originally "Engineering – the Aviation Maintenance Holding", but has been rebranded as S7 Technics Holding. Its headquarters are in Moscow, Russia.

The company is owned by S7 Airlines, which is owned by Vladislav Filev. The company owns Epic Aircraft, headquartered in Bend, Oregon, United States.

References

 MRO divisions tend to separate from  Airlines, Air Transport Observer Magazine, 02/03/2012
 Airlines convert MRO divisions into a separate business, Air Transport Observer, 29/12/2011
Engineering Holding completed D-check for aircraft Airbus A319, Air Transport Observer, 16/12/2011
 Russian investment in the U.S. aviation industry, Air Transport Observer, 11/03/2012
  Engineering Holding performed redelivery of 3 aircraft Boeing B737CL for ILFC, Air Transport Observer, 17/04/2012 
 Epic Aircraft announced acquisition by Engineering Holding

Aviation companies based in Russia
Aircraft maintenance companies
Companies established in 1998
Companies based in Moscow